Madison Correctional Institution may refer to:
 Madison Correctional Institution (Florida), a state prison for men in Madison, Madison County, Florida
 Madison Correctional Institution (Ohio), a state prison for men located in London, Madison County, Ohio